The George Brown Darwin Botanic Gardens is a botanical garden located 2 km north of the CBD of Darwin, Northern Territory, Australia.

History

The gardens were established on their present site in 1886; this was the third attempt by European settlers of Darwin to establish a site where plants of economic importance could be tested for their suitability in the tropics. Initially the collection of the gardens was focused on economic gardening and the ornamental plantings. The gardens were severely damaged during Cyclone Tracy in 1974, 89% of all plants were lost. Restoration after the cyclone was led by George Brown, who had worked at the gardens since 1969 and served as curator from 1971 to 1990, and who was Lord Mayor of Darwin from 1992 until 2002. The gardens were renamed in 2002 to recognize George Brown's contribution and 32 years service to the development of the gardens.

In 2000 Darwin's historic former Wesleyan Methodist church was moved from Knuckey Street and reconstructed at the Gardens. It is the oldest surviving building in Darwin. Today, the old church building houses Eva's Botanical Gardens Cafe.

Collections
The gardens contain a major collection of Northern Australian monsoon flora; these include communities like mangroves, monsoon vine thicket, Tiwi Islands wet forest and those found on the Arnhem Land escarpment. The gardens also has a large collection of native and introduced tropical plants including cycads, palms, Adansonia, gingers and heliconias.

Access and transport 
George Brown Darwin Botanic Gardens is accessible by a number of entrances. The main entrance and visitor parking is located at Gardens Rd. A secondary entrance with parking is situated at the end of Geranium street which is a turn-off from Stuart Highway. Pedestrians and cyclists can also access from Gilruth Avenue.

Public transport is available by bus number 10 which stops close to the Geranium Street entrance as well as bus number 4 which has a stop close to the Gardens Road entrance.

References

External links

1886 establishments in Australia
Botanical gardens in Australia
Tourist attractions in Darwin, Northern Territory
Gardens in the Northern Territory